An unconditional surrender is a surrender in which no guarantees are given to the surrendering party. It is often demanded with the threat of complete destruction, extermination or annihilation.

In modern times, unconditional surrenders most often include guarantees provided by international law. Announcing that only unconditional surrender is acceptable puts psychological pressure on a weaker adversary, but it may also prolong hostilities.

Examples

Banu Qurayza during Muhammad's era

After the Battle of the Trench, in which the Muslims tactically overcame their opponents while suffering very few casualties, efforts to defeat the Muslims failed, and Islam became influential in the region. As a consequence, the Muslim army besieged the neighbourhood of the Banu Qurayza tribe, leading to their unconditional surrender.<ref
  name="Watt, pp. 167–174"
>Watt, Muhammad: Prophet and Statesman, pp. 167–174.</ref
>    All the men, apart from a few who converted to Islam, were executed, while the women and children were enslaved.<ref
  name="Peterson"
>Peterson, Muhammad: the prophet of God, p. 125-127.</ref
><ref
  name="Ramadan140"
>Ramadan, In the Footsteps of the Prophet, p. 140f.</ref
><ref
>Hodgson, The Venture of Islam, vol. 1, p. 191.</ref
><ref
  name="Brown, p. 81"
>Brown, A New Introduction to Islam, p. 81.</ref
><ref
 name="Lings229"
>Lings, Muhammad: His Life Based on the Earliest Sources, p. 229-233.</ref
>    The historicity of the incident has been questioned.<ref
>  For details and references see discussion in main article.  </ref>

Napoleon Bonaparte
When Napoleon Bonaparte escaped from his enforced exile on the island of Elba, one of the steps that the delegates of the European powers at the Congress of Vienna took was to issue a statement on 13 March 1815 declaring Napoleon Bonaparte to be an outlaw. The text includes the following paragraphs:

However, they did so to prevent him from being a martyr and exiled him to the remote South Atlantic island of Saint Helena.

American Civil War
The most famous early use of the phrase in the American Civil War occurred during the 1862 Battle of Fort Donelson. Brigadier General Ulysses S. Grant of the Union Army received a request for terms from Confederate Brigadier General Simon Bolivar Buckner Sr., the fort's commanding officer. Grant's reply was that "no terms except an unconditional and immediate surrender can be accepted. I propose to move immediately upon your works." When news of Grant's victory, one of the Union's first in the war, was received in Washington, DC, newspapers remarked (and President Abraham Lincoln endorsed) that Grant's first two initials, "U.S.," stood for "Unconditional Surrender," which would later become his nickname.

However, subsequent surrenders to Grant were not unconditional. When Robert E. Lee surrendered his Army of Northern Virginia at Appomattox Court House in 1865, Grant agreed to allow the men under Lee's command to go home under parole and to keep sidearms and private horses. Generous terms were also offered to John C. Pemberton at Vicksburg and, by Grant's subordinate, William Tecumseh Sherman, to Joseph E. Johnston in North Carolina.

Grant was not the first officer in the Civil War to use the phrase.  The first instance came some days earlier, when Confederate Brigadier General Lloyd Tilghman asked for terms of surrender during the Battle of Fort Henry. Flag Officer Andrew H. Foote replied, "no sir, your surrender will be unconditional." Even at Fort Donelson, earlier in the day, a Confederate messenger approached Brigadier General Charles Ferguson Smith, Grant's subordinate, for terms of surrender, and Smith stated, "I'll have no terms with Rebels with guns in their hands, my terms are unconditional and immediate surrender." The messenger was passed along to Grant, but there is no evidence that either Foote or Smith influenced Grant's choice of words.

In 1863, Ambrose Burnside forced an unconditional surrender of the Cumberland Gap and 2,300 Confederate soldiers, and in 1864, Union General Gordon Granger forced an unconditional surrender of Fort Morgan.

World War II

The use of the term was revived during World War II at the Casablanca conference in January 1943 when American President Franklin D. Roosevelt stated it to the press as the objective of the war against the Axis Powers of Germany, Italy, and Japan. When Roosevelt made the announcement at Casablanca, he referred to General Grant's use of the term during the American Civil War.

The term was also used in the Potsdam Declaration issued to Japan on July 26, 1945. Near the end of the declaration, it said, "We call upon the government of Japan to proclaim now the unconditional surrender of all Japanese armed forces" and warned that the alternative was "prompt and utter destruction."

It has been claimed that it prolonged the war in Europe by its usefulness to German domestic propaganda, which used it to encourage further resistance against the Allied armies, and by its suppressive effect on the German resistance movement since even after a coup against Adolf Hitler:
 It has also been argued that without the demand for unconditional surrender, Central Europe might not have fallen behind the Iron Curtain. "It was a policy that the Soviet Union accepted with alacrity, probably because a completely destroyed Germany would facilitate Russia's postwar expansion program." It has also been claimed to have prolonged the war with Japan or to be a cause of the atomic bombings of Hiroshima and Nagasaki (see debate over the atomic bombings of Hiroshima and Nagasaki).

One reason for the policy was that the Allies wished to avoid a repetition of the stab-in-the-back myth, which had arisen in Germany after World War I and attributed Germany's loss to betrayal by Jews, Bolsheviks, and Socialists, as well as the fact that the war ended before the Allies had reached Germany. The myth was used by the Nazis in their propaganda. An unconditional surrender was felt to ensure that the Germans knew that they had lost the war themselves.

Bangladesh War of Independence

On 16 December 1971, Lt. Gen A. A. K. Niazi, CO of Pakistan Armed Forces located in East Pakistan (now Bangladesh) signed the Instrument of Surrender handing over the command of his forces stationed in East Pakistan to the Indian Army under General Jagjit Singh Aurora. This led to the surrender of 93,000 personnel including families of the Pakistan's East Command and cessation of hostilities between the Pakistani Armed Forces and the Indian Armed Forces along with the guerrilla forces, the Mukti Bahini.

The signing of this unconditional surrender document gave Geneva Convention guarantees for the safety of the surrendered soldiers and completed the independence of Bangladesh.

Afghanistan Civil War
On 15 August 2021, the Government of the Islamic Republic of Afghanistan and the Afghan National Security Forces unconditionally surrendered to the Taliban. The unconditional surrender brought an end to the conflict and allowed the Taliban to takeover Afghanistan and establish their government in the country.

Surrender at discretion
In siege warfare, the demand for the garrison to surrender unconditionally to the besiegers is traditionally phrased as "surrender at discretion." If there are negotiations with mutually agreed conditions, the garrison is said to have "surrendered on terms." One example was at the Siege of Stirling, during the 1745 Jacobite Rebellion:

Surrender at discretion was also used at the Battle of the Alamo, when Antonio López de Santa Anna asked Jim Bowie and William B. Travis for unconditional surrender. Even though Bowie wished to surrender unconditionally, Travis refused, fired a cannon at Santa Anna's army, and wrote in his final dispatches:

The phrase surrender at discretion is still used in treaties. For example, the Rome Statute, in force since July 1, 2002, specifies under "Article 8 war crimes, Paragraph 2.b:"

The wording in the Rome Statute is taken almost word for word from Article 23 of the 1907 IV Hague Convention The Laws and Customs of War on Land: "...it is especially forbidden – ... To kill or wound an enemy who, having laid down his arms, or having no longer means of defence, has surrendered at discretion", and it is part of the customary laws of war.

See also
Surrender (military)
Debellatio designates the end of a war caused by complete destruction of a hostile state.
Military occupation
Giving no quarter, refusal by the victor to spare the lives of surrendered foes
Suing for peace

References

External links
 German Surrender Documents of WWII (US Historical Documents)

Surrenders
Military strategy